Sheryl Williams Stapleton (born July 30, 1957) is an American politician and educator who served as a member of the New Mexico House of Representatives from 1995 until her resignation in July 2021. A member of the Democratic Party, she also served as the majority floor leader in the House from 2017 to 2021.

Early life and education 
Stapleton was born in Saint Croix. She was raised in Chicago and New York City. She earned a Bachelor of Science degree in education from New Mexico State University, followed by Master of Arts in multicultural education and PhD in educational leadership from the University of New Mexico.

Career 
Prior to entering politics, Stapleton worked as an educator in the Albuquerque Public Schools. She also served as the coordinator for the Schools to Careers Program and assistant principal of the Career Enrichment Center. She was first elected to the New Mexico House of Representatives in 1994 and is the first African-American woman elected to the New Mexico Legislature. She has also served as vice chair of the Democratic Party of New Mexico and a member of the Democratic National Committee from New Mexico. Following the 2016 elections, Williams was chosen by the Democratic Caucus of New Mexico as house majority leader. She was the first African American majority leader of the New Mexico House.

Investigators from the New Mexico Attorney General's office executed a search warrant on July 27, 2021 on Stapleton's home, business, and employer.

On July 30, 2021, Stapleton resigned from the House amid a criminal investigation into alleged "racketeering, money laundering, receiving illegal kickbacks, and violations of the New Mexico Governmental Conduct Act".

On Aug 31, 2021 Albuquerque Public Schools fired Stapleton from her position as Career and Technical Education director.

Stapleton was charged on September 20, 2021 with 28 criminal counts, including racketeering, money laundering and fraud by diverting funds from  Albuquerque Public Schools and receiving kickbacks from Robotics Learning Management LLC "in return for arranging or recommending the purchase, lease or ordering of the company’s goods by Albuquerque Public Schools."

References

External links
 Representative Sheryl Williams Stapleton at the New Mexico Legislature
 Project Vote Smart profile
 Campaign Contributions: 2008, 2006, 2004, 2002, 2000
 New Mexico Votes profile
 Sheryl Williams Stapleton's Ballotpedia page

1958 births
21st-century American politicians
21st-century American women politicians
African-American state legislators in New Mexico
African-American women in politics
Living people
Democratic Party members of the New Mexico House of Representatives
Politicians from Albuquerque, New Mexico
Women state legislators in New Mexico
21st-century African-American women
21st-century African-American politicians
20th-century African-American people
20th-century African-American women